Darius Brubeck (born June 14, 1947) is an American jazz keyboardist and educator. He is the son of jazz legend Dave Brubeck. He spent many years in Durban, South Africa, as a professor and head of the Centre for Jazz and Popular Music at the University of Natal.

Biography
Born in San Francisco, California, Brubeck majored in ethnomusicology and the history of religion at Wesleyan University, graduating cum laude. Brubeck holds an MPhil from the University of Nottingham. "He was awarded a Bellagio Project Residency (Rockefeller Foundation) as Composer in 2005 and received 'Outstanding Service to Jazz Education' awards in 1988, 1992, 1994, 1998, 2005 and 2006." Darius performed (with all three of his brothers) at the 2009 Kennedy Center Honors Gala when his father received a medal for his lifetime contribution to American culture. Brubeck currently lives in the south of England in East Sussex.

Early career 
While still an undergraduate at Wesleyan, Brubeck worked on "Christopher's Movie Matinee" - a film for the National Film Board of Canada; he is credited for composing music and performing on the screen. During the 1970s and early '80s, pianist Brubeck led his own groups, played with Don McLean, Larry Coryell and toured the world with Two Generations of Brubeck and The New Brubeck Quartet (Dave, Darius, Chris and Dan Brubeck). Several albums were recorded along the way.

Teaching 

Brubeck's focus changed to South Africa in 1983, when he initiated the first degree course in Jazz Studies offered by an African university. He taught at the University of KwaZulu-Natal (UKZN), Durban, South Africa, and was later appointed Director of the Centre for Jazz and Popular Music, where he remained until 2006. After leaving full-time teaching, he was made a Senior Research Associate of the School of Music. While based in London, he taught courses at the Guildhall School of Music and Drama and Brunel University. He has an M.Phil Degree from the University of Nottingham, where he also taught jazz history for a year.

South Africa 

For 15 years Darius Brubeck and Afro Cool Concept (a band with South Africa's premier alto saxophonist Barney Rachabane), toured all over southern Africa and overseas. The band's last CD, Still On My Mind, was released in 2003 on Sheer Sound. Other recordings released by Sheer include Before It’s Too Late (2004) and Tugela Rail and Other Tracks (2007).

International tours included a series of concerts celebrating 10 years of democracy in South Africa. In 2004, together again with his brothers (Chris and Dan), Darius headlined at the National Arts "Joy of Jazz Festival", South Africa, and directed the South African National Youth Jazz Band at the North Sea Jazz Festival in the Netherlands.

Beginning in 1988 with "The Jazzanians", the first mixed-race student band from a South African university, Brubeck formed several bands that officially represented his university and South Africa. He was also invited to play and/or give workshops in the UK, Europe, Turkey, Peru, and Thailand and at five International Association of Jazz Educators (IAJE) conferences in the USA.

From 1989 until leaving South Africa for London in 2005, he was Director of the Centre for Jazz and Popular Music at the University of KwaZulu-Natal in Durban.

Composer 

Apart from writing for his own bands, Darius Brubeck's arrangements and a composition for Dave Brubeck's 80th birthday can be heard on Dave Brubeck – Live with the LSO (2000). In 2005, the Rockefeller Foundation awarded Darius a residency as a composer at the Bellagio Study and Conference Center in Italy. In 2004, the Lincoln Center Jazz Orchestra commissioned a piece by Darius and Zim Ngqawana, setting music to extracts from speeches by Nelson Mandela and Desmond Tutu. These were read by Morgan Freeman at the New York City premiere.

Gathering Forces 

Gathering Forces (GF) was the name of Darius Brubeck's former fusion band in the 1970s and early 1980s that recorded Earthrise. A later version of GF featuring Deepak Ram on bansuri recorded Gathering Forces 2.

Brubeck's CD label, also called Gathering Forces, released For Lydia and the Lion and Earthrise in 2008, Two and Four in 2010 and Cathy's Summer in 2014, all by the Darius Brubeck Quartet. Brubecks Play Brubeck was made on tour in 2010 and released the following year.

Current 

Brubeck's recent performances since leaving South Africa include appearances at the Cape Town International Jazz Festival in 2007 and 2008, the Kennedy Center Honors Gala Concert in 2009, Jazz at Lincoln Center in 2014 and the Edinburgh Festival in 2015 which was broadcast by BBC Radio 3, with his current group, The Darius Brubeck Quartet. The Darius Brubeck Quartet is regularly featured at UK festivals, including the Marlboro, Henley-on-Thames and Scarborough among many others, and appears at such top London jazz clubs as Ronnie Scott's. He also leads "Brubecks Play Brubeck", featuring three Brubeck brothers (Darius, Chris, Dan) plus British saxophonist Dave O'Higgins, which has been touring annually in either the UK or the US since 2010. Although intended to be a one-off event, "Brubecks Play Brubeck" toured in the UK again in 2011 and 2013, played at the Cape Town International Jazz Festival in 2012 and Jazz at Lincoln Center in 2014.

Darius Brubeck is a Fulbright Senior Specialist in Jazz Studies. He taught at Yıldız Technical University in Istanbul in 2007 and spent the first term of 2010 at the Gheorghe Dima Music Academy in Cluj (Romania).

Darius Brubeck has created music for all types of ensemble, large and small, and one of his recent pieces is now included in the Royal School's international Grade V piano syllabus. He is co-author with Michael Rossi of Odd Times: Uncommon Etudes in for Uncommon Time Signatures, published by Advance Music in 2014.

On March 23, 2020, it was announced that Darius Brubeck had contracted COVID-19 and was placed in an ICU in London and given a tracheostomy to help with his breathing.

References

External links
Darius Brubeck's website
Kennedy, Gary W.: "Darius Brubeck", Grove Music Online, ed. L. Macy (accessed August 31, 2007)  
Darius Brubeck online Harmony course - Getting To The Good Stuff Fast on MusicGurus.com
Darius Brubeck online Jazz Piano course - Mastering Odd Times on MusicGurus.com

1947 births
21st-century composers
Educators from California
American expatriates in Romania
American expatriates in South Africa
American expatriates in Turkey
Living people
Jazz musicians from San Francisco
Academic staff of the University of Natal
Wesleyan University alumni
Pianists from San Francisco
Pupils of Darius Milhaud
21st-century American musicians
American expatriates in the United Kingdom
Alumni of the University of Nottingham
20th-century American pianists
American male pianists
American male jazz musicians
Dave Brubeck Quartet members